Watson Creek is a  long 1st order tributary to Richardson Creek in Union County, North Carolina.

Course
Watson Creek rises in a pond about 5 miles north of Watson, North Carolina and then flows south to join Richardson Creek about 1 mile southeast of Watson.

Watershed
Watson Creek drains  of area, receives about 48.1 in/year of precipitation, has a wetness index of 429.44, and is about 32% forested.

References

Rivers of North Carolina
Rivers of Union County, North Carolina